Kordabad or Kerdabad or Kardabad or Kord Abad or Kard Abad may refer to:
Kordabad, East Azerbaijan
Kordabad, Gilan
Kordabad, Golestan
Kordabad, Aqqala, Golestan Province
Kerdabad, Hamadan
Kordabad, Isfahan
Kordabad-e Olya, Lorestan Province
Kordabad-e Sofla, Lorestan Province
Kordabad, Markazi
Kerdabad, Mazandaran
Kordabad, Semnan
Kordabad, South Khorasan
Kordabad, Yazd
Kerdabad, Mehriz, Yazd Province
Kordabad, Zanjan